Arispie Township is one of twenty-five townships in Bureau County, Illinois, USA.  As of the 2020 census, its population was 763 and it contained 355 housing units.

Geography

Cities
 Tiskilwa (east half)

Major highways
  Interstate 180
  Illinois Route 26
  Illinois Route 29

Lakes
 Goose Lake

Demographics
As of the 2020 census there were 763 people, 398 households, and 243 families residing in the township. The racial makeup of the township was 92.27% White, 0.39% African American, 0.66% Native American, 0.79% Asian, 0.00% Pacific Islander, 0.79% from other races, and 5.11% from two or more races. Hispanic or Latino of any race were 2.49% of the population.

There were 398 households, out of which 29.90% had children under the age of 18 living with them, 52.01% were married couples living together, 6.28% had a female householder with no spouse present, and 38.94% were non-families. 36.70% of all households were made up of individuals, and 12.60% had someone living alone who was 65 years of age or older. The average household size was 2.29 and the average family size was 2.97.

The township's age distribution consisted of 21.7% under the age of 18, 13.4% from 18 to 24, 16.2% from 25 to 44, 26.4% from 45 to 64, and 22.3% who were 65 years of age or older. The median age was 43.3 years. For every 100 females, there were 121.4 males. For every 100 females age 18 and over, there were 101.1 males.

The median income for a household in the township was $48,654, and the median income for a family was $61,858. Males had a median income of $41,786 versus $15,568 for females. The per capita income for the township was $26,835. About 9.1% of families and 9.9% of the population were below the poverty line, including 13.6% of those under age 18 and 5.4% of those age 65 or over.

Political districts
 Illinois' 11th congressional district
 State House District 73
 State Senate District 37

References
 
 United States Census Bureau 2007 TIGER/Line Shapefiles
 United States National Atlas

External links
 City-Data.com
 Illinois State Archives

Townships in Bureau County, Illinois
Populated places established in 1849
Townships in Illinois
1849 establishments in Illinois